The 1941 Fordham Rams football team was an American football team that represented Fordham University as an independent during the 1941 college football season. Rams offense scored 182 points while the defense allowed 67 points. Fordham was invited to play in the Rose Bowl, but declined the invitation because it had previously accepted a berth in the 1942 Sugar Bowl. They were ranked sixth in the final AP poll, released in early December.

Fordham's Steve Filipowicz was selected by the Associated Press a first-team back on the 1941 All-Eastern football team. Guard Larry Sartori was named to the second team.

The Rams won the Sugar Bowl by a score of 2–0 over the Missouri Tigers. The game was played in heavy rain and the only score came off of a blocked punt in the

Schedule

References

Fordham
Fordham Rams football seasons
Lambert-Meadowlands Trophy seasons
Sugar Bowl champion seasons
Fordham Rams football